Crocker is an unincorporated community in Liberty Township, Porter County, in the U.S. state of Indiana.

History
Crocker was founded in 1892, when railroad service was extended to that point. The community was most likely named for a railroad engineer. A post office was established at Crocker in 1893, and remained in operation until it was discontinued in 1905. In 1912, Crocker had about 200 inhabitants.

Geography

References

Unincorporated communities in Porter County, Indiana
Unincorporated communities in Indiana